Euxiphocerus is a genus of fly in the family Dolichopodidae from the Afrotropical realm. It was originally placed in the subfamily Rhaphiinae, but some authors now place it in Medeterinae, tribe Systenini.

Species
The genus contains three species:
Euxiphocerus disjunctus Grichanov, 2009
Euxiphocerus savannensis Grichanov, 2009
Euxiphocerus savannensis capensis Grichanov, 2009
Euxiphocerus savannensis savannensis Grichanov, 2009
Euxiphocerus wulfi Parent, 1935

References

Dolichopodidae genera
Medeterinae
Diptera of Africa